River Road Independent School District is a public school district based in rural north central Potter County, Texas (USA). The district serves parts of Amarillo north of Loop 335.

The boundary for the school district is roughly Loop 335 to the south, West Amarillo Creek to the west, the Canadian River to the north, and SH 136 to the east.

Extracurricular activities
River Road ISD offers football, basketball, volleyball, baseball, softball, cross country, track, and golf. The mascot for the athletic teams is the Wildcat. River Road High School is classified as a 3A school by the University Interscholastic League (UIL). In addition to athletics, the school district offers band, theatre, and art. Clubs sponsored by the school includes NHS, FFA, Spanish Club, Book Club,  Cosmetology, Welding, Student Council, Prom Committee, CNA, and EMT programs.

Academics
In the school year 2018-2019 RRISD was rated an overall “B” by the Texas Education Agency

Administration
The school district is led by a superintendent along with an assistant superintendent. Additionally, River Road ISD has a board of trustees made up of volunteers that are elected by community members.

Schools
River Road High School (Grades 9–12)
Principal: Dean Birkes
River Road Middle School (Grades 6–8)
Principal: Rachel Freeman 
Rolling Hills Elementary School (Grades 2–5)
Principal: Erin Brandstatt
Willow Vista Early Childhood Academy (PK-1)
Principal: Arely Diaz

References

External links
River Road ISD

School districts in Potter County, Texas
School districts in Amarillo, Texas